Total Fiasco is American songwriter Glenn Robinson's debut EP, released on December 12, 2012 on Wreck Kidz Lbl.

The EP was intended to be a ten-song full-length album but due to some last minute changes, half of the album was scrapped. The songs on Total Fiasco were narrowed down to showcase the best examples of Robinson's back catalog of music. The tracks "The Worst", "Desperate with Standards" and "Fire in the Hole!" were all written five years prior to recording. The only new songs written at the time were "I Really Shouldn't Bother" and "I Don't Know How to Leave You Alone". The latter never ended up being recorded and was swapped with the Elvis Costello cover of "No Action".

Track listing

Personnel
Glenn Robinson - drums, guitar, bass, vocals
Brian Shovelton - guitar leads on The Worst and I Really Shouldn't Bother
Additional background vocals - Justin "Juice" McGovern, Tom Moran, and Chris Piquette

References

2013 debut EPs